The Soil and Water Conservation Bureau (SWCB) is the agency of the Council of Agriculture of the Taiwan (ROC) with the main tasks of soil and water conservation, watershed management and erosion control.

History
SWCB was originally established as the China Rural Reviving United Committee in 1952. In 1961, it became the Mountain Agricultural Resources Development Bureau and in 1989 it was restructured to become the Soil and Water Conservation Bureau.

Organizational structure

Operation units
 Planning Division
 Watershed Conservation and Management Division
 Rural Development Division
 Monitoring and Management Division
 Debris Flow Disaster Prevention Center

Administrative units
 Secretariat Office
 Personnel Office
 Accounting Office
 Civil Service Ethics Office

Branch offices
 Taipei City
 Taichung City
 Nantou County
 Tainan City
 Taitung County
 Hualien County

List of Director-Generals
 Lee Chen-yang (15 January 2015 - )
 Huang Ming-Yao (30 May 2010 - 15 January 2015)
 Wu Huei-Long (2 May 2001 - 30 May 2010)
 Chen Chih-ching (16 July 1996 - 2 May 2001)

See also
 Council of Agriculture (Taiwan)

References

External links
 

1952 establishments in Taiwan
Executive Yuan
Government agencies established in 1952
Organizations based in Nantou County